Manuel G. Collantes (August 20, 1917 – May 28, 2009) was a Filipino diplomat who served as the country's acting Minister of Foreign Affairs in 1984.

Collantes was raised in Tanauan, Batangas. He received his law degree from Far Eastern University in 1940, and passed the bar exam later that same year. He began his career by working as an assistant attorney at the Claro M. Recto law office for a short period. He also taught diplomacy and international law, as well as parliamentary practice at Far Eastern University.

He met his wife, Consuelo Madrigal, in Washington, D.C. in 1949 while Collantes was working as the second secretary and consul at the Embassy of the Philippines in Washington, D.C. The couple married during the 1970s. Former Senator Ana Consuelo "Jamby" Madrigal is Collantes' niece.

Collantes held a variety of positions with the Department of Foreign Affairs during his career as a diplomat. These included Aide-de-Camp to the Secretary of Foreign Affairs to Deputy Minister for Foreign Affairs and legal assistant secretary.

Collantes was appointed acting Minister for Foreign Affairs for a short period in 1984 during the government of President Ferdinand Marcos.

In 1984, he was elected as an assemblyman for Batangas province. He also served as the director of United Pulp and Paper Company, Inc. until his death in 2009.

Manuel Collantes died of cardiopulmonary arrest on May 28, 2009, at the age of 91. His body was laid in state at their family home in Forbes Park, Makati. He was buried at the Madrigal Mausoleum in Ayala Alabang, Muntinlupa, following a funeral mass.

See also
Department of Foreign Affairs (Philippines)

References

2009 deaths
Secretaries of Foreign Affairs of the Philippines
Filipino diplomats
People from Tanauan, Batangas
Members of the House of Representatives of the Philippines from Batangas
Far Eastern University alumni
Recipients of Gawad Mabini
1917 births
Ferdinand Marcos administration cabinet members
Members of the Batasang Pambansa